Joint compound (also known as drywall compound, drywall mud, or mastic) is a white powder of primarily gypsum dust mixed with water to form a paste the consistency of cake frosting, which is used with paper or fiber joint tape to seal joints between sheets of drywall to create a seamless base for paint on interior walls and ceilings. It is often referred to simply as mud or as joint cement.

Comparison with spackling paste

The joint compound is comparable and contrastable with spackling paste. The similarities and differences are discussed at Spackling paste § Comparison with joint compound.

Drying type
Drying-type joint compounds are vinyl based and harden when they dry by evaporation.

Ready-mix lightweight joint compound
A ready-mix lightweight joint compound is a pre-made joint compound designed for fast application and easy maintenance. The compound is a complex combination often including water, limestone, expanded perlite, ethylene-vinyl acetate polymer, attapulgite, and other ingredients. The delicate mixture of compounds gives it a creamy texture that spreads easily onto drywall surfaces and then hardens as the moisture evaporates. Drying type compound takes a long time to dry out and is used to fill holes or gaps and shrinks as it drys, possibly producing cracks in thick applications. A ready-mix joint compound is usually more forgiving than the setting type of joint compound. It can be used for as long a period as needed and does not dry up unless left unattended for a long period, but it must be kept from freezing. This compound should be used at temperatures above , and all materials should be at a similar temperature.

There are mainly three types of premixed joint compounds.

One premixed taping compound is used for bedding and taping coat.

2 Finishing or topping compound is used for filling and finishing coats.

3 All-purpose joint compounds can be used in bedding and taping coats, filling and finishing coats.

Powdered drying type
Powdered drying-type compounds are available.

Setting type
Setting-type joint compounds come in powder form and are mixed with water immediately before use. This type contains plaster of paris and sets through a chemical hardening process rather than evaporation, which gives it an advantage in filling holes and gaps that would take many days to dry out and have shrinkage cracks using the drying compound. Setting type compounds are available in setting times ranging from 5 to 300 minutes and types that bond exceptionally well and are tough, and types that are soft and easy to sand. Once mixed with water, the setting type must be used before it sets; any leftover is wasted, and if not enough is mixed, another batch is needed to finish the job, and all tools must be very clean, or the compound may be set up prematurely. This makes the setting type compounds more complex and time-consuming to prepare, but they are set quickly. Some drywall professionals use setting type mud for the first coat and a drying type for the thinner finish coat. Setting-type compounds do not soften when they get wet. Thus, they are better for moist environments, such as bathrooms.

Special types
Walls built to slow the spread of fire are called a firewall and are sometimes built using special fire-resistant drywall. A special joint compound for use with fire-rated drywall is needed.

Reduced dust formulas cause the dust particles to clump together, falling out of the air sooner than regular formulas, thus reducing airborne dust.

Moisture- and mold-resistant formulas are available.

Tapeless drywall joint compound 

In recent years, some companies in Europe, Australia and Canada have developed a new type of drywall joint compound called tapeless. It can be applied directly to the joints without either paper or fibreglass mesh tape. It can save about 30% of labour time for finishing the drywall joints.

So far, every tapeless joint compound is a setting compound. There are two types of tapeless setting compounds: one is a setting compound reinforced by some powerful chemical glues. The other is a fiber-reinforced setting compound. 

Lately a Canadian company has developed a fiber-reinforcement additive which can be mixed with either setting or air-drying premixed drywall joint compounds and turn the regular drywall joint compounds into tapeless joint compounds.

Usage
Ready-mixed joint compound is most commonly used in hanging drywall for new or remodeled homes. Application is simple and easy, rarely taking more than three or four coats. When used for new walls, the joint compound effectively eliminates all blemishes from the surface of the drywall, such as fasteners, damage, or drywall tape. Joint compound is used to finish gypsum panel joints, corner bead, trim and fasteners, and skim coating. In addition, it is also convenient for fixing minor blemishes or damages to walls. It quickly patches holes, bumps, tears, and other minor damage.

Often referred to as drywall taping mud, joint compound is the primary material used in the drywall industry by a tradesperson, or applicator, called a "drywall mechanic," "taper," or "drywall taper."  A similar compound is used in sprayed-on textural finishing for gypsum panel walls and ceilings pre-sealed and coated with a joint compound. The flexibility and plastic qualities of joint compound make it a very versatile material both as a sealer or finishing coat for wall surfaces and in decorative applications ranging from machine sprayed texturing to hand-trowelled or even hand-crafted and sculptural finishes.  In North America, applying joint mud and drywall tape sealer and trowelled joint compound on gypsum panels is a standard construction technique for painted wall and ceiling surfaces.  Until more recently, in North America and through the world, several different plasters such as veneer plaster and "plaster of Paris" have been used in similar ways to joint compounds as fillers or for decorative purposes since ancient times, and the actual make up, and working properties of these compounds is much similar. Modern ready-mixes or powder and water mixes are available in a wide range of styles, from slow-drying to quick-drying, to suit specific demands for use by contractors or decorators.

Mudding is usually done in three layers, and it is essential to use the correct type of mud for the first and last layer through a multi-purpose compound may be adequate for all coats: Bedding coat or taping coat where the mud is applied to seams and corners and paper joint tape is pressed into the mud (if using a fiberglass mesh tape the self-adhering tape is applied to the joints first, and the mud pressed through the tape). The mud used here needs to adhere well and be strong and is called a taping compound; filler coat where the tape is covered and roughly smoothed; and the finish coat or topping coat which is very smooth. A topping compound is soft, smooth and easy to sand. Some finish coat sanding is usually required to get a smooth surface. Sheets of drywall usually have tapered edges to provide space for the thickness of the tape and mud at the seams.

While joint compounds are used for bedding tape and initial layers overtop, applying topping compound for finish layer(s) that level and sand more evenly is best.  Both require thinning for practical application.

Applying and sanding the compound is messy work, and finished surfaces, such as floors and air handling ducts, must be covered.

Pockmarks are a defect caused by air bubbles which form after the joint compound is applied. The bubbles are caused by the inability of moisture to be absorbed into the surface, such as when the surface is already painted, has a layer of grease or cigarette smoke, or a drying-type compound is applied over a dense, setting-type compound. The moisture exits through the finished surface, making bubbles dry as pockmarks. The bubbles can be reworked while the compound is drying to get a smooth surface. Although additives exist to reduce pockmarks, their use is discouraged by drywall manufacturers. However, these products reduce bonding, so they should not be used on the bed coat.

Health concerns
Construction workers who sand drywall joint compound are often exposed to high concentrations of dusts, talc, calcite, mica, gypsum, and in some cases, respirable silica.
Some of these have been associated with varying degrees of eye, nose, throat, and respiratory tract irritation. 
Over time, breathing the dust from drywall joint compounds may cause persistent throat and airway irritation, coughing, phlegm production, and breathing difficulties similar to asthma. When silica is present, workers may also face an increased risk of silicosis and lung cancer.

Joint compound mixes manufactured before the 1980s often contained a complex mixture of several substances. Among the additives used were asbestos fibers, which provided cohesiveness. Exposure to friable asbestos increases the risks of various severe health conditions, including cancer.  Joint compounds manufactured from 1980 onward were required to omit asbestos in favor of other compounds due to legislation banning the widespread use of asbestos.

For these reasons, constant use of a respirator is recommended by almost all drywall compound manufacturers and is required by some labor authorities.

See also

References

Building materials
Plastering